Wuling San Wan (Pīnyīn: Wǔlíng sǎn wán) is a blackish-brown pill used in traditional Chinese medicine to "invigorate the function of the kidney and cause diuresis". It is slightly aromatic and tastes slightly pungent. It is used where there is "oliguria, edema and abdominal distension accompanied by vomiting, diarrhea, dryness of the mouth but no desire for drink due to dysfunctional activity of bladder-qi, stagnation of endogenous hygrosyndrome inside the body". The binding agent of the pill is honey.

Chinese classic herbal formula

See also
 Chinese classic herbal formula
 Bu Zhong Yi Qi Wan

References

Traditional Chinese medicine pills